Chaman Rural District is in Takht-e Soleyman District of Takab County, West Azerbaijan province, Iran. At the National Census of 2006, its population was 3,410 in 744 households. There were 3,325 inhabitants in 796 households at the following census of 2011. At the most recent census of 2016, the population of the rural district was 2,650 in 835 households. The largest of its 21 villages was Tazeh Kand-e Nosratabad, with 851 people.

References 

Takab County

Rural Districts of West Azerbaijan Province

Populated places in West Azerbaijan Province

Populated places in Takab County